Kamonkoli is a town in Budaka District, in the Eastern Region of Uganda.

Location
The coordinates of Kamonkoli are 1°04'30.0"N, 34°05'44.0"E (Latitude:1.075005; Longitude:34.095568).

Overview
Kamonkoli is the location of the second factory of Uganda Clays Limited, Uganda's largest manufacturer of clay building products.

In 2012, ground was broken on a planned Kamonkoli Cement Factory. Further media reports indicate the factory is operational.

Kamonkoli is the end of the southeastern leg of the Tirinyi–Pallisa–Kamonkoli–Kumi Road, which links this town to Pallisa via Iki-Iki.

References

Populated places in Eastern Region, Uganda
Cities in the Great Rift Valley
Budaka District